Rudkhanah-i-Duzdi also known as the Nahr-az-Zankan River was a river in Medieval Southern Persia. Mentioned by Marco Polo,  Istakhri   and by Yaqut al-Hamawi Its name means River of Robbers.

Rudkhanah-i-Duzdi was also the name of a village on the river with about 500 inhabitants, known in colonial times. It is in the Jiroft area, possibly a tributary of the Minab River.

References

Populated places in Minab County
Rivers of Iran
Populated places along the Silk Road
Asian archaeology
History of the Middle East